Alexander Edward Hassan (born April 1, 1988) is an American former Major League Baseball (MLB) outfielder who played for the Boston Red Sox in 2014.

Amateur career

A native of Quincy, Massachusetts, Hassan attended Boston College High School and Duke University. A two-way player in college, he posted a .342 average with three home runs and 39 runs batted in as a junior at Duke in 2009. He also led the team with 56 runs scored, while going 2-2 with a 4.10 earned run average and a team-leading eight saves in 16 games pitched. In 2008 and 2009, he played collegiate summer baseball with the Orleans Firebirds of the Cape Cod Baseball League and was named a league all-star in 2009. He was selected by the Boston Red Sox in the 20th round of the 2009 draft.

Professional career

Boston Red Sox

Hassan was originally drafted as a pitcher, but impressed enough in the Cape Cod League in 2009 that the Boston organization decided to switch him to outfield. Being able to play in all three outfield positions, he is best suited at left field.

In his first season, he batted a combined .328 average in 34 games with Short Season-A Lowell and Class A Greenville, gaining a promotion to Advanced-A Salem in 2010.

In 2010, he batted .287 in 107 games for Salem and led the team in walks (57) and on-base percentage (.397), before joining Triple-A Pawtucket late in the season for only three games.

He opened 2011 with Double A Portland, and batted .291 with 13 home runs and 64 RBI in 126 games. He finished 3rd in the Eastern League in on-base percentage (.406), 4th in walks (76), 8th in On-base plus slugging (.902) and 12th in batting, while earning an EL All-Star berth during the midseason. In addition, he led all outfielders with a .995 fielding percentage, after committing only one error in 210 total chances, while his on-base percentage also was the best in the Red Sox minor league system.

Hassan was rated by Baseball America as having the best strike zone judgment in the Red Sox organization entering the 2012 season. He returned to Pawtucket in 2012. Even though he played only 94 games because of assorted injuries, he hit a career-low .256 average, but ranked 2nd in the team in OBP (.377), 3rd in RBI (46), and 8th in runs (39), hits (80) and doubles (12).

Hassan got a late start to the 2013 season with Pawtucket after recovering from injuries, being limited to 63 games, but grabbed a firm hold of his spot on the 40-man roster. He finished with a .338 average, which was the best in the organization, driving in 35 runs and scoring 30 times, while collecting a .457 OBP (also a best) and a .471 of slugging.

Hassan was called up to Boston from Pawtucket on May 30, 2014, and made his MLB debut on June 1. In his major league debut, he went one for three with a hit in three at-bats with a run scored. He was optioned back to Pawtucket on June 8.

Texas Rangers
On November 17, 2014, Hassan was claimed off waivers by the Oakland Athletics. He was designated for assignment by Oakland, and on November 20, 2014, he was claimed by the Baltimore Orioles. The Orioles designated him for assignment on February 25, 2015, and he was reclaimed by Oakland on February 27. He was designated for assignment by the Athletics on April 8. He was claimed by the Texas Rangers the next day.

Oakland Athletics
After being placed on waivers by the Rangers, Hassan was claimed by the Oakland Athletics and optioned to the Triple-A Nashville Sounds on May 2, 2015. He was designated for assignment on May 8 and released four days later.

Toronto Blue Jays

On May 20, 2015, Hassan signed a minor league contract with the Toronto Blue Jays. He elected free agency on November 6.

Los Angeles Dodgers
Hassan signed a minor league contract with the Los Angeles Dodgers in December 2015. He was given a non-roster invitation to Dodgers spring training and was assigned to the Triple-A Oklahoma City Dodgers. He played in 88 games and hit .232. He announced his retirement from baseball on January 19, 2017, via Twitter.

Minnesota Twins
In 2018 Hassan became the Assistant Director of Minor League Operations for the Minnesota Twins.

References

External links

1988 births
Living people
Sportspeople from Quincy, Massachusetts
Baseball players from Massachusetts
Major League Baseball outfielders
Boston Red Sox players
Duke Blue Devils baseball players
Orleans Firebirds players
Lowell Spinners players
Greenville Drive players
Salem Red Sox players
Pawtucket Red Sox players
Portland Sea Dogs players
Scottsdale Scorpions players
Tigres del Licey players
American expatriate baseball players in the Dominican Republic
Nashville Sounds players
Dunedin Blue Jays players
Buffalo Bisons (minor league) players
Oklahoma City Dodgers players
Boston College High School alumni